The subcutaneous tissue of penis (or superficial penile fascia) is continuous above with the fascia of Scarpa, and below with the dartos tunic of the scrotum and the fascia of Colles.

It is sometimes just called the "dartos layer".

It attaches at the intersection of the body and glans.

The term "superficial penile fascia" is more common, but "subcutaneous tissue of penis" is the term used by Terminologia Anatomica.

See also
 Subcutaneous tissue
 Fascia

References

External links
 

Mammal male reproductive system
Human penis anatomy
Fascia